Totius may refer to:

Jakob Daniël du Toit (1877–1953), an Afrikaner poet, known as Totius
Imperator totius Hispaniae, the title of Spanish monarchs
Totius Graeciae Descriptio, a bestselling 16th century map of Greece drawn by Nikolaos Sophianos
Optatam Totius, the Decree on Priestly Training, was a document produced by the Second Vatican Council